Tucker Station is a neighborhood of Louisville, Kentucky centered along Tucker Station Road and Rehl Road.

Neighborhoods in Louisville, Kentucky